The Department of Justice (DoJ), is the department responsible for the laws of Hong Kong headed by the Secretary for Justice. Before 1997, the names of the department and the position was the Legal Department and Attorney General respectively. The Department of Justice's main value is the rule of law. This law is the law that has brought Hong Kong the success of being known as the world's international financial centre. Their leading principle consists of the quote “One country, Two Systems”. The Department of Justice is very important in the legal system in many ways. One being that they give legal advice to other departments in the government system. “drafts government bills, makes prosecution decisions, and promotes the rule of law”. Its main goal is to ensure that Hong Kong's status as the main centre for legal services is enhanced and maintained.

History 
In March 2021, after 15 of 47 pro-democracy figures were granted bail by a court, the DoJ immediately filed an appeal, sending the 15 people back to their detention cells.

Also in March 2021, Hong Kong Free Press reported that 3 defendants were acquitted of rioting because they were not physically present at the riot, with the DoJ later complaining to the Court of Final Appeal that the acquittal was erroneous and that people could still be participants in a crime even if not physically present, such as by using social media and pressing the "like" button.

In April 2021, a spokesman for the DoJ commented on US ambassador Hanscom Smith's criticism of Hong Kong's arrest of Jimmy Lai, claiming that "It is regrettable to note that the convictions have drawn unfair criticisms with political overtones. Any assertion to suggest that 'Beijing [is] eroding Hong Kong's freedoms' is totally baseless."

Separately in April 2021, the DoJ asserted that in cases involving the national security police, the police would be exempt from laws that cover the search and seizure of journalists' material. In response, the Hong Kong Journalists Association said that the move would make it more difficult for journalists to protect their sources.

Also in April 2021, after the sentencing of Jimmy Lai and other pro-democracy figures drew criticism from overseas politicians, the DoJ released a statement saying that though the government attaches great importance to rights and freedom, those freedoms are not absolute.

In December 2022, the DoJ said criticisms were "far from the truth" when the CEO of Maxwell Chambers said "Hong Kong, in particular, was one place where some parties with very long-term contracts avoided putting it as the seat of arbitration, due to uncertainty about the legal environment after Hong Kong returned to China, even with assurances of 50 years of self-government and freedom of speech."

Organisation
 Secretary for Justice's Office
 Prosecutions Division (Hong Kong) - headed by the Director of Public Prosecutions, handles prosecutions in the majority of appeals and trials in the Court of First Instance and District Court.
 Civil Division - headed by the Law Officer (Civil Law), provides legal advice on civil law to all Government bureaux and departments and represents the Government both as solicitors and as barristers in all civil litigation, including arbitrations
 Legal Policy Division - servicing the needs of the Solicitor General, and giving legal policy advice in respect of matters currently being considered by the Government
 Law Drafting Division - is responsible for drafting almost all legislation, and all Government subsidiary legislation
 International Law Division - is headed by the Law Officer (International Law) and provides advice on public international law to the Government and negotiates, or provides legal advisers on negotiations, for bilateral agreements. Also handles mutual judicial assistance matters.
 Administration and Development Division - is headed by the Director of Administration and Development

Law of Hong Kong

National Law
Under Article 18 of Basic Law, numerous nation laws of China apply in Hong Kong. Under Article 158 of Basic Law, the clarification of term of the Basic Law by the Standing Committee of the National People's Congress is to be followed by the courts of Hong Kong in operating the related clause.

Basic Law
The main principle of basic law is “one country, two system”. Although China took back Hong Kong in 1997, the previous law in force in Hong Kong (laws of equity, ordinances, subordinate, subordinate legislation, common law and customary law) still remain unchanged for 50 years. Except some law related to foreign affairs and defense, nation law of China will not apply on Hong Kong.

International law
There are more than 200 treaties and agreement in Hong Kong. The Hong Kong domestic law does not create the treaty unless the legislation gives force. However, it affects the common law. The rapid growth of international laws may become immersed into the common law.

Bilateral agreements
Air Services Agreements (ASAs)
Surrender of Fugitive Offenders Agreements (SFOs)
Double Taxation Avoidance Agreements (DTAs)
Mutual Legal Assistance Agreements (MLAs)
Investment Promotion & Protection Agreements (IPPAs)
Consular Agreements
Environment Cooperation Agreements
Memorandum of Understandings on Labour Cooperation
Agreements and Arrangements for the Establishments of International Organisations in Hong Kong
Free Trade Agreements

Five performances Pledges

Preamble
The Department of Justice's main function is to help the government of Hong Kong Special Administrative Region through providing legal services and advice. This department, run by the Secretary for Justice, contains the Secretary for Justice's office, which is split into six different sections:

1. Administration and Development division

2. Legal Policy division

3. Prosecutions division

4. Civil division

5. Law Drafting division

6. International Law division

Mission
In order to provide the best service available to their clients, the department has promised to do their best and maintain their quality of work and ethics, follow all appropriate rules that are required by legal professions of higher power, and make sure to notify their clients the possible implications and requirements in any course of action.

Performance Standards and Targets
In general, they try to respond to correspondences that do not need a legal opinion within 10 days. If there is no response within that time frame, an interim reply will be sent out. As well, to in order to recognise a letter of complaint, it must be sent no later than 10 days and they must provide a justifiable reply within 30 days. For more complicated cases. they require a longer processing time.

Effective Monitoring
The department of Justice makes sure to do everything to the best of their ability. The quality of their work and effort will constantly be monitored by the senior management in order to improve their efforts from time to time

The User’s Role
The department of Justice is open to comments and suggestions and feedback to how they are doing their services. If one wishes to provide some input, their public number is 2867 2198.

Offices

 Justice Place - current
 23rd Floor, High Block, Queensway Government Offices - former

See also
 Judiciary of Hong Kong

References

External links
 Official site

Justice
Prosecution
Hong Kong, Justice
1997 establishments in Hong Kong
Government agencies established in 1997